The Seafarers' Charity (Seafarers UK, formerly King George's Fund for Sailors) is the leading grant-making charity that has been helping people in the maritime community for over 100 years, by providing vital funding to support seafarers in need and their families. The charity supports organisations and projects that make a real difference to people's lives across the Merchant Navy, Fishing Fleets, Royal Navy and Royal Marines.

In 2022, The Seafarers' Charity awarded £3.1m in grants to support 61 maritime welfare charities.

Description 

The UK depends on its seafarers to defend its shores, import over 90% of its essential food, fuel and medicines, and catch its fish. The job of a seafarer is therefore vital, but also demanding and hazardous with a much greater chance of injury than many other professions. A large number of those serving will be facing problems of very different kinds; long periods of separation from friends and family, extended periods of duty, fatigue, and working heavy machinery whilst being exposed to harsh weather. 
Such dangers and difficulties can lead to disability, depression, debt, relationship breakdown, homelessness or even death. 

The Seafarers' Charity's funding enables seafarers to access advice and information, adapt to life on shore, re-train and find new employment. It also improves their quality of life by helping to provide the essentials of daily living that a small pension (or none) cannot cover. Often it may be the family of a seafarer who has been injured, held hostage or who has subsequently died that require assistance.

Because The Seafarers' Charity works closely with many organisations that support seafarers and their dependants, the charity can target donations where they will make the biggest difference.

The Seafarers' Charity receives no government funding and relies on donations and fundraising to be able to carry on providing long-term aid. Without this, there simply wouldn't be the level of support it is able to provide today and that each year gives hope and help to over 160,000 seafarers and their families when they need it most.

History 

The First World War took a terrible toll on merchantmen and warships: in one fortnight in 1917 many thousands of sailors and over 400,000 tons of shipping were lost. Many of those men had a family to support, and towards the end of the war many small charitable organisations were set up to support the injured and bereaved.

In the City of London, far-sighted ship-owners and officers realised that what was most needed was an umbrella organisation that could take a realistic overview of the need and direct resources to where they were needed. They set up a Fund for that purpose and His Majesty King George V took a deep and immediate interest, giving both his name and an establishing donation of £5,000 to the new organisation.

During subsequent conflicts, and in the intervening years of peace, King George's Fund for Sailors continued to provide both immediate and long-term support to the casualties of war, and to others who have paid a high price for a life at sea.

The Charity has always supported veterans, the injured and the bereaved, but as an umbrella organisation, its focus is on the needs of the whole maritime community. In the modern world that means the charity also deals with such issues as homelessness, unemployment, the strain on separated families, the poverty and hardship that afflict shoreline communities (e.g. when fish stocks dwindle or merchant vessels grow too large for local docks).

In 2005 King George's Fund for Sailors adopted the working name Seafarers UK. This was changed in 2021 to The Seafarers' Charity, to make it clearer how the Charity supports seafarers in need and their families.

Grant funding 

The Seafarers' Charity is a leading provider of grants to organisations that support those who work – or have worked – at sea, and their families. The Seafarers' Charity operates a continuous grant making process and assesses applications on a rolling basis.

Influence in the maritime sector 

The launch of The Seafarers' Charity's four-year strategy in 2020 increased its traditional role of grant-funding to include its influence work. More than issuing grants, The Seafarers' Charity recognises that in order to reduce welfare need, disadvantage, and hardship, circumstances that lead to seafarers needing help must be identified. The Charity's grant funding is therefore combined with collaboration, research and advocacy to increase the Charity's positive impact for the working, and retired, seafarers.

Campaigning 

Each year The Seafarers' Charity campaigns on behalf of seafarers across the Merchant Navy, Royal Navy and Fishing Fleets to raise awareness of the UK's maritime sector in its entirety – and thereby increase public understanding of the challenging lives of many seafarers.

The charity's considerable influence is also being applied elsewhere for effective campaigning. The Seafarers' Charity is a member of Maritime UK, the pan-industry promotional body, for whom The Seafarers' Charity chairs its 'Careers Promotion Forum'.

Fly the Red Ensign for Merchant Navy Day 

The annual The Seafarers' Charity campaign 'Fly the Red Ensign for Merchant Navy Day' launched in 2015, and takes place on Merchant Navy Day on 3 September. The campaign encourages public bodies to fly the Red Ensign, the official flag of the UK Merchant Navy, ashore atop civic buildings and on prominent flag poles to raise public awareness of the UK's dependence on seafarers past, present and future. The campaign also encourages donations and fundraising for the charity's Merchant Navy Fund.

In 2022, the campaign received more than 38 million impressions on social media and reached a total of 9.8 million accounts.

In previous years, the Red Ensign was also flown above 10 Downing Street. In 2019, then Prime Minister Boris Johnson said, "2019 marks the centenary of King George V's grant of the title 'Merchant Navy'. I am delighted that, in honour of this milestone, the Red Ensign flag will fly above 10 Downing Street on this Merchant Navy Day."

Fundraising 

The Seafarers' Charity receives no statutory funding and relies on supporters, donors and volunteers to be able to carry on providing the long-term aid. Annually, The Seafarers' Charity runs a number of fundraising events to raise vital funds to continue providing essential support to seafarers in need and their families.

Partner organisations 

The Seafarers' Charity works with numerous partner organisations across all its campaigning, fundraising and grant-giving work, including Marine Society & Sea Cadets, The Merchant Navy Welfare Board, Trinity House

Governance 

The Seafarers' Charity's governing document is the Royal Charter, first issued in 1920 and last amended in 2010. The Royal Charter describes The Seafarers' Charity's charitable objects as:

 The relief of seafarers, their families or dependants, who are in need
 The education and training of people of any age to prepare for work or service at sea
 The promotion of the efficiency and effectiveness of the maritime charitable sector and
 The promotion of safety at sea.

Patron and Trustees

Patron 

Her Late Majesty Queen Elizabeth II

President 
His Royal Highness, The Earl of Wessex and Forfar, KG, GCVO

Chairman 
Paul Butterworth AFNI

Deputy Chairman 
William Reid

Trustees 

 Mr D W T Bain FCA
 Mr N Blazeby
 Ms D Cavaldoro
 Captain L Clarke, MN
 Mr P French
 Ms N Ghani MP
 Mr M Gray
 Mr R Greenwood
 Mr G Kidd
 Mr W Lawes
 Rear Admiral I Lower MA, AFNI
 Surgeon Commodore F Marshall RN
 Mr J Monroe
 Ms N Shaw FCIPD FRSA

References

External links
 

Sailing in the United Kingdom
Social welfare charities based in the United Kingdom
Organisations based in the City of Westminster
Organizations established in 1917
1917 establishments in the United Kingdom